Edward Roman Sadowski (January 19, 1931 – November 6, 1993) was a catcher in Major League Baseball who played in all or part of four seasons between  and  for the Boston Red Sox (1960), Los Angeles Angels (1961–1963) and Atlanta Braves (1966). Sadowski batted and threw right-handed. He debuted on April 20, 1960 and played his final game on October 2, 1966. He was the brother of Bob Sadowski and Ted Sadowski, and uncle of Jim Sadowski. All were pitchers who played in the Major Leagues.

Coming from a Pittsburgh, Pennsylvania baseball family, Sadowski was a valuable backup catcher for Russ Nixon in Boston, Earl Averill and Buck Rodgers with the Angels, and Joe Torre in Atlanta. In 1963 he appeared in a career-high 80 games and collected four home runs with 24 runs and 15 RBI, also career-numbers.

In a five-season career, Sadowski was a .202 hitter with 12 home runs and 39 RBI in 217 games.

He was the last Red Sox player to wear uniform #8 before it was issued in 1961 to eventual Baseball Hall of Fame outfielder Carl Yastrzemski, then a rookie. The number was retired in 1989.

Following his playing career, Sadowski served as a minor league manager and pitching instructor for the Montreal Expos. He retired from baseball in 1970, becoming a physical education teacher in California. He died in Garden Grove at age 62, after suffering amyotrophic lateral sclerosis (ALS), commonly called Lou Gehrig's disease.

External links

The Deadball Era
Retrosheet
Venezuelan Professional Baseball League statistics
 

1931 births
1993 deaths
Albany Senators players
American military personnel of the Korean War
American people of Polish descent
Atlanta Braves players
Atlanta Crackers players
Baseball players from Pittsburgh
Birmingham Barons players
Boston Red Sox players
Dallas Rangers players
Deaths from motor neuron disease
Greensboro Patriots players
Hawaii Islanders players
Industriales de Valencia players
Los Angeles Angels players
Louisville Colonels (minor league) players
Major League Baseball catchers
Marion Red Sox players
Minneapolis Millers (baseball) players
Minor league baseball managers
Montgomery Grays players
Player-coaches
Radford Rockets players
Richmond Braves players
San Francisco Seals (baseball) players
Spokane Indians players
Neurological disease deaths in California